The 2017 Pan American Men's Youth Handball Championship the XIII edition of this tournament took place in Santiago, Chile from 15 to 22 April 2017. It acts as a qualifying tournament for the 2017 Men's Youth World Handball Championship.

Participating teams

Referees
Following six referee pairs were selected by the Pan-American Team Handball Federation for the championship:

Preliminary round

Group A

All times are local (UTC−03:00).

Group B

Knockout stage

Bracket

5–8th place bracket

5–8th place semifinals

Semifinals

Consolation round

Seventh place game

Fifth place game

Third place game

Final

Final standing

Awards
All-star team
Goalkeeper:  Santiago Giovagnola
Right Wing:  Martín Arakaki
Right Back:  Leonardo Comerlatto
Center Back:  Yericson Monroy
Left Back:  Paulo Cândido
Left Wing:  Guilherme Torriani
Pivot:  José Luis López
MVP:  Paulo Cândido

References

External links
Championship page on PATHF Official Website

Pan American Men's Youth Handball Championship
Pan American Men's Youth Handball Championship
Pan American
Pan American
2017 in Chilean sport